Wolfen may refer to:

Places 
 Wolfen, Germany, town in Saxony-Anhalt

Fiction 
 The Wolfen, 1978 horror novel by Whitley Strieber
 Wolfen (film), 1981 horror film

Gaming 
 An enemy in Kya: Dark Lineage
 Wolfen, the ships used by the Star Wolf team in the Star Fox series
 A species of wolf-like humanoids in Rackham's Cadwallon role-playing game and Confrontation miniatures game

Other uses 
 ORWO, (Original Wolfen), a brand of photographic films